Türüc is a Turkish surname. Notable people with the surname include:

Deniz Türüç (born 1993), Turkish footballer
Sedat Türüc, or mononym Sedat, German Turkish singer, also part of group Become One

Turkish-language surnames